Wayne Cao (born Nguyễn Cảo; December 7, 1946) is a Canadian politician and former member of the Legislative Assembly of Alberta, where he represented the district of Calgary-Fort as a Progressive Conservative.  He was first elected in the 1997 provincial election and was re-elected four times.  He is perhaps best known as the sponsor of the legislation that led to the enshrining of Alberta.  In April 2008, he elected as the Legislature's Deputy Speaker and Chair of Committees and served in that position for the 27th Legislature.  Mr. Cao also served as a member of the Standing Committee on Resource Stewardship.

Early life

Cao was born December 7, 1946 in northern Vietnam.  He studied engineering, mathematics, and computing science in Saigon and at the University of Auckland and the University of Waterloo. After the Vietnam War, he came to California as a refugee - he boarded an American helicopter just before the fall of Saigon - and settled in Calgary in 1976.  He worked for Shell Petroleum for twenty-six years before taking early retirement in 1997 to enter politics.  During this time, he also lectured at the Southern Alberta Institute of Technology.

Political career 

Cao first sought public office in the 1997 provincial election, when he ran in the riding of Calgary-Fort as the Progressive Conservative.  He was elected handily, and was re-elected in each of the next three elections.  He supported Jim Dinning in the 2006 P.C. leadership race.

In April 2008, he was elected by his legislator colleagues as the Deputy Speaker of the Legislative Assembly of Alberta, defeating Len Mitzel and Bridget Pastoor in a secret ballot. Cao would announce he would retire from the legislature in February 2015, prior to the 2015 Alberta general election which saw the Progressive Conservative dynasty end when the New Democratic Party would be elected to a majority government. Cao's former electoral district Calgary-Fort would elect New Democrat Joe Ceci.

Legislative initiatives

Cao has moved a large number of private member's bills.  Of these, the only one to pass was 2001's Alberta Official Song Act, which established a contest for the province's official song, with the winner to be selected by an all party committee of the legislature.  It passed with the support of members from all parties, although Progressive Conservative Rob Renner felt that the province's official song should be something that was already known to most Albertans rather than a new song composed for the occasion, and Liberal Hugh MacDonald argued that no official song was necessary, since Alberta already had an "unofficial song", Alberta Bound (which MacDonald recalled hearing Ian Tyson sing at the closing ceremonies of the 1988 Winter Olympics, although the song, along with Four Strong Winds, was actually sung at the opening ceremonies by Tyson and Gordon Lightfoot, the song's composer and singer).  The ensuing competition selected Alberta, composed by Mary Kieftenbeld, as the province's official song.  Cao followed this bill with efforts to encourage the translation of O Canada into all languages spoken by Canadians; he composed a Vietnamese version and sang it on the Canadian Broadcasting Corporation.

Cao also made headlines in 2007 with the School (Canadian History Content) Amendment Act, which would have mandated that 75% of the instructional hours in high school social studies courses be devoted to Canadian history.  Several MLAs spoke in opposition to the bill, including Liberals Bill Bonko (who felt, as a former school trustee, that any percentage should be mandated by local school boards) and Harry Chase, New Democrat David Eggen (who suggested that global history was as or more important than Canadian history), and Progressive Conservative Education Minister Ron Liepert (who agreed with Eggen and who extolled the virtues of the recently implemented existing social studies curriculum).  Outside of the legislature, Progressive Conservatives Neil Brown and Len Webber expressed reservations about the decision being made at the political, rather than local, level.  The legislature adjourned before the bill came to a vote.

Cao also sponsored the Employment Standards (Parental Leave) Amendment Act, which would have combined the provisions for adoptive leave and maternity leave and extended them to 27 weeks (Alberta's maternity leave provisions were, at the time, the least generous in the country).  He first introduced the bill in 1999, but the legislature adjourned before it reached second reading.  He re-introduced it in 2000, when several MLAs, including Liberals Don Massey, Laurie Blakeman, Linda Sloan, and Percy Wickman and Progressive Conservatives Moe Amery, Karen Kryczka, and Mary Anne Jablonski, spoke in support of the bill on second reading.  Only Shiraz Shariff spoke against, citing concerns that the business community hadn't been sufficiently consulted.  The bill passed second reading with 34 votes in favour and four (Gary Friedel, Richard Magnus, Barry McFarland, and Rob Renner) against.  However, the legislature adjourned while the bill was still in committee.

In 2008, Cao sponsored the Alberta Volunteer Service Medal Act, which would have established a medal for exceptional volunteers.  It received bipartisan support from Progressive Conservatives Jonathan Denis, Carl Benito, Neil Brown, and Greg Weadick and Liberals Hugh MacDonald and Darshan Kang, but was ultimately hoisted on a motion from Progressive Conservative Fred Horne.  The bill's opponents included Liberal Harry B. Chase (who felt that the government's role in volunteer recognition should come in the form of support, rather than in the form of after-the-fact recognition) and Progressive Conservatives Richard Marz (who argued that medals should be restricted to those who had risked their lives), Heather Forsyth (who was concerned by the level of bureaucracy in the bill), George Rogers (who suggested that it duplicated existing government programs), Ray Prins (who was concerned that by singling out individual volunteers it would demean the contributions of those who weren't recognized), and Doug Griffiths (who echoed Rogers' arguments and also expressed concern that the proposed award would have a built in bias in favour of volunteers with large organizations).

His other private member's bills have included 1997's Highway Traffic Amendment Act, 2002's Environmental Protection and Enhancement (Residential Land Disclosure) Amendment Act, 2003's Financial Summit Act, and 2004's Government Accountability (Identification of Expenditures) Amendment Act, none of which reached second reading.

In addition to his private member's bills, Cao has sponsored a government bill, the Tobacco Tax Amendment Act of 2003.  The bill was in response to an increase in the number of Albertans buying tobacco products out of province, after the government imposed taxes on the import of tobacco products to Alberta that saw taxes on such goods more than double.  It passed after little debate.  Cao also sponsored a successful private bill in 1998, the Tanya Marie Bryant Adoption Termination Act.

Personal life

Cao is married to Kim Hoang.  The pair have three sons: William (a lawyer), Winston (an engineer), and Willis (a scientist). They also have three grandchildren.

He identifies Confucius and Winston Churchill as his political heroes.

Election results

See also
 List of University of Waterloo people

External links 
 Wayne Cao's web page

References 

Progressive Conservative Association of Alberta MLAs
Living people
Vietnamese emigrants to Canada
1946 births
University of Waterloo alumni
University of Auckland alumni
Vietnamese refugees
Vietnamese emigrants to the United States
Canadian politicians of Vietnamese descent
People in information technology
Politicians from Calgary
21st-century Canadian politicians